The 1977–78 Cypriot Second Division was the 23rd season of the Cypriot second-level football league. Omonia Aradippou won their 1st title.

Format
Fourteen teams participated in the 1977–78 Cypriot Second Division. All teams played against each other twice, once at their home and once away. The team with the most points at the end of the season crowned champions. The first team was promoted to 1978–79 Cypriot First Division. The last  team was relegated to the 1978–79 Cypriot Third Division.

Changes from previous season
Teams promoted to 1977–78 Cypriot First Division
 APOP Paphos FC

Teams relegated from 1976–77 Cypriot First Division
 ASIL Lysi

Teams promoted from 1976–77 Cypriot Third Division
 Akritas Chlorakas

Teams relegated to 1977–78 Cypriot Third Division
 ENAD Ayiou Dometiou FC

League standings

See also
 Cypriot Second Division
 1977–78 Cypriot First Division
 1977–78 Cypriot Cup

References

Cypriot Second Division seasons
Cyprus
1977–78 in Cypriot football